Mimobatocera laterifusca is a species of beetle in the family Cerambycidae, and the only species in the genus Mimobatocera. It was described by Breuning in 1970.

References

Batocerini
Beetles described in 1970
Monotypic beetle genera